Amir Ariely (Or Amir Arieli; ; born 3 March 2003) is an Israeli footballer who plays as a centre-back for Hapoel Be'er Sheva from the Israeli Premier League.

Career

Hapoel Be'er Sheva 
On January 30, 2023, Ariely signed with Hapoel Be'er Sheva of the Israeli Premier League for three and a half years.

Career statistics

References

External links
Amir Ariely at SoccerWay

2003 births
Israeli Jews
Living people
Israeli footballers
Footballers from Tel Aviv
Hapoel Be'er Sheva F.C. players
Israeli Premier League players
Israeli expatriate footballers
Expatriate footballers in England
Israeli expatriate sportspeople in England